General Sir William Francis Patrick Napier KCB (7 December 178512 February 1860) was a British soldier in the British Army and a military historian.

Early life
Napier was born at Celbridge, County Kildare, the third son of Colonel George Napier (1751–1804) and his wife, Lady Sarah Lennox (1745–1826).

Military service
He became an ensign in the Royal Irish Artillery in 1800, but at once exchanged into the 62nd, and was put on half-pay in 1802.  He was afterwards made a cornet in the Royal Horse Guards by the influence of his uncle the duke of Richmond, and for the first time did actual military duty in this regiment, but he soon fell in with Sir John Moore's suggestion that he should exchange into the 52nd, which was about to be trained at Shorncliffe Army Camp.  Through Sir John Moore he soon obtained a company in the 43rd, joined that regiment at Shorncliffe and became a great favourite with Moore.

He served in Denmark, and was present at the engagement of Koege (Køge), and, his regiment being shortly afterwards sent to Spain, he bore himself nobly through the retreat to Corunna, the hardships of which permanently impaired his health.  In 1809 he became aide-de-camp to his cousin the Duke of Richmond, Lord Lieutenant of Ireland, but joined the 43rd when that regiment was ordered again to Spain. With the light brigade (the 43rd, 52nd, and 95th), under the command of General Craufurd, he marched to Talavera in the famous forced march which he has described in his History, and had a violent attack of pleurisy on the way.

He, however, refused to leave Spain, was wounded on the Coa, and shot near the spine at Cazal Nova. His conduct was so conspicuous during the pursuit of Masséna after he left the lines of Torres Vedras that he as well as his brother George was recommended for a brevet majority. He became Brigade Major, was present at Fuentes d'Onoro, but had so bad an attack of fever that he was obliged to return to England.

In England he married his cousin Caroline Amelia Fox, daughter of General, the Honourable Henry Fox and niece of the statesman Charles James Fox.  They had a number of children, one of whom, Pamela Adelaide Napier, married Philip William Skynner Miles and had a son, Philip Napier Miles.  Another daughter, Louisa Augusta Napier, married General Sir Patrick Leonard MacDougall who, after her death, married Marianne Adelaide Miles, a sister of Philip William Skynner Miles.

Three weeks after his marriage he again started for Spain, and was present at the storming of Badajoz, where his great friend Colonel McLeod was killed.  In the absence of the new Lieutenant-Colonel he took command of the 43rd regiment (he was now a substantive Major) and commanded it at the Salamanca.  After a short stay at home he again joined his regiment at the Pyrenees, and did his greatest military service at the Nivelle, where, with instinctive military insight, he secured the most strongly fortified part of Soult's position, practically without orders.  He served with his regiment at the battles of the Nive, where he received two wounds, Orthes, and Toulouse.  For his services he was made brevet Lieutenant-Colonel, and one of the first Companions of the Bath.  Like his brother Charles he then entered the military college at Farnham.  He commanded his regiment in the invasion of France after Waterloo, and remained in France with the army of occupation until 1819, when he retired on half-pay.  As it was impossible for him to live on a Major's half-pay with a wife and family, he determined to become an artist, taking a house in Sloane Street, where he studied with George Jones, the academician.

Historian
The years he had spent in France he had occupied in improving his general education, for, incredible as it seems, the author of the History of the War in the Peninsula could not spell or write respectable English till that time.  But his career was to be great in literature, not in art.  This skill appeared in an able review of Jomini's works (Edinburgh Review) in 1821, and in 1823 Henry Bickersteth suggested that he write a history of the Peninsular War.

For some time Napier did not take kindly to the suggestion, but at last decided to become an author in order to defend the memory of Sir John Moore, and to prevent the glory of his old chief being overshadowed by that of Wellington.  The Duke of Wellington himself gave him much assistance, and handed over the whole of Joseph Bonaparte's correspondence that was captured at the battle of Vittoria; this was all in cipher, but Mrs Napier, with great patience, discovered the key.  Marshal Soult took an active interest in the work arranging for a French translation of Mathieu Dumas.

The first volume of his History appeared in 1828.  The publisher John Murray was disappointed by the sales of the first volume so Napier published the remainder himself.  But it was at once seen that the great deeds of the Peninsular War were about to be fittingly commemorated.  The excitement which followed the appearance of each volume was proof of innumerable pamphlets issued by those who believed themselves to be victims, by dint of personal altercations with many distinguished officers.  The success of the book proved still further an absence of competition amidst bitter controversy.  The histories of Southey and Lord Londonderry fell still-born, and Sir George Murray, Wellington's quartermaster-general, who had been determined to produce an historical work, gave up the attempt in despair.  Napier's success was due to a combination of factors.  When in 1840 the last volume of the History was published, his fame not only in England but in France and Germany was well established.

His life during these years had been chiefly absorbed in his History, but he warmly sympathized with the movement for political reform which was agitating England. 'The Radicals' of Bath, (forerunners of Chartism), among many other cities and towns pressed him to enter parliament.  Napier's friends actually invited to become the military chief of a national guard to obtain reforms by force of arms.  Naturally enough for a 'Waterloo man' he refused this dubious honour on the ground that he was in bad health and had a family of eight children.  In 1830 he had been promoted Colonel, and by 1841 he attained the rank of Major-General and was appointed Lieutenant Governor of Guernsey.  On Guernsey was engaged in controlling relations between soldiers and the inhabitants.  He was working on proposals for a complete scheme of reform in the government of the island, upsetting many people in the process, when his tenure came to an end.

During this time, Napier had a fateful falling out with John Gurwood, who – like Napier – was closely associated with the Napoleonic Wars as a veteran, historian and Commander of the Bath. In a very public row, Napier questioned Gurwood's bravery during the Siege of Ciudad Rodrigo.  Gurwood, like Napier, suffered serious discomfiture from wounds received in battle, which was compounded by a deep depression, culminating with Gurwood committing suicide on Christmas Day 1845, by cutting his own throat.

While he was at Guernsey his brother Charles had conquered Sindh, and the attacks made on the policy of that conquest brought William Napier again into the field of literature.  In 1845 he published his The Conquest of Scinde, and in 1851 the corresponding History of the Administration of Scinde, which in style and vigour rivalled the great History, written for sensational purposes, not to maintain an enduring popularity. In 1847 he resigned his governorship, and in 1848 was made a K.C.B., and settled at Scinde House, Clapham Park. In 1848 he was given the colonelcy of the 27th (Inniskilling) Regiment of Foot which he held until 1853, when he transferred to succeed his brother Charles as colonel of the 22nd (Cheshire) Regiment of Foot.  In 1851 he was promoted Lieutenant-General.

His time was fully occupied in defending his brother, in revising the numerous editions of his History which were being called for, and in writing letters to The Times on every conceivable subject, whether military or literary.  His energy is the more astonishing when it is remembered that he never recovered from the effects of the wound received at Cazal Nova, that he often lay about on his back for months to assuage.

William's domestic life was overshadowed by an incurable illness of his only son, and when his brother Charles died in 1853 the world seemed to darken around him.  He devoted himself to writing a life for his brother, which appeared in 1857, and which is in many respects his most characteristic book.  At the end of 1853 his younger brother, Captain Henry Napier RN., died and, in 1855, his brother Sir George.  Inspired by his work, he lived on till the year 1860, when, broken by trouble, fatigue and ill-health, he died at Clapham, and was buried at West Norwood.  Four months earlier he had been promoted to the full rank of general.

There is a memorial to him in St Paul's Cathedral.

Works
The Encyclopædia Britannica Eleventh Edition considered his military history, at the time, to be "incomparably superior to any other English writer", comparing him to three other soldier-writers: Thucydides, Julius Caesar and Enrico Caterino Davila. Among his works are:
 History of the War in the Peninsula and the South of France from the Year 1807 to the Year 1814 (6 vols.) (1828–40)
 The Conquest of Scinde (1845)
 History of General Sir Charles Napier's Administration of Scinde, and Campaign in the Cutchee Hills (1851)
 The life and opinions of General Sir Charles James Napier, (4 vols.) (1857)

See also 

 Father – Colonel George Napier (1751–1804)
 Mother – Lady Sarah Lennox (1745–1826), daughter of Charles Lennox, 2nd Duke of Richmond
 Brother – Sir Charles James Napier (1782–1853), Commander-in-Chief, India.  The city of Napier, New Zealand is named after him.
 Brother – Sir George Thomas Napier (1784–1855), Commander–in–Chief of the Army in the Cape Colony
 Brother – Henry Edward Napier (1789–1853), naval officer and historian
 Grandson – Philip Napier Miles (1865–1935), philanthropist and composer

References

Bibliography 
 
 
 

|-

|-

 

1785 births
1860 deaths
British Army generals
British Army personnel of the Napoleonic Wars
People from County Dublin
People from County Kildare
William Francis Patrick
Burials at West Norwood Cemetery
Knights Commander of the Order of the Bath
British military historians
The Times journalists
Historians of the Napoleonic Wars